Ust-Orot is a rural locality (a selo) in Kizhinginsky District, Republic of Buryatia, Russia. The population was 622 as of 2010. There are 6 streets.

Geography 
Ust-Orot is located 18 km northwest of Kizhinga (the district's administrative centre) by road. Kodunsky Stanok is the nearest rural locality.

Notable people 
Gunsyn Tsydenova (1909–1994), politician

References 

Rural localities in Kizhinginsky District